Mundo de fieras (English: Love and Cruelty) is a Mexican telenovela produced by Salvador Mejía Alejandre for Televisa that premiered on July 31, 2006, and ended on January 19, 2007. It is a remake of the Venezuelan telenovela Mundo de fieras, produced in 1991. The telenovela stars César Évora, Gaby Espino, Edith González, Ernesto Laguardia, Helena Rojo and Michelle Vieth.

Plot
Gabriel and Demián are identical twins but very different. Gabriel grew up in the high society while his brother grew up in poverty which caused him to have a grudge against Gabriel and wants to destroy him.

Gabriel is a widow who remarried to the hysterical Joselyn. An accident makes Joselyn miscarry and causes disability to Luisito, the son of her and Gabriel. Joselyn blames her husband and makes his life miserable, with help from her mother Miriam and her daughter Karen from her first marriage. They are the "beasts" that destroy Gabriel. Yes

One day a young humble named Mariángela comes to the mansion to teach Luisito, and Gabriel falls in love with her. The "beasts" takes charge to destroy Mariángela, especially when they discover that she is the illegitimate daughter of Don Clemente, Miriam's husband and father of Joselyn.

Cast

Main

César Évora as Gabriel Cervantes-Bravo / Demián Martínez Guerra
Edith González as Joselyn Rivas del Castillo Arizmendi de Farías / de Cervantes-Bravo
Gaby Espino as María Ángela Cruz/María Ángela Rivas del Castillo Cruz
Ernesto Laguardia as Leonardo Barrios Arizmendi
Helena Rojo as Miriam Arizmendi Vda. de Rivas del Castillo
Azela Robinson as Dolores Farías
Laura Flores as Regina Farías de Martínez
René Casados as Nicolás Navarro
Sebastián Rulli as Juan Cristóbal Martínez Farias
Sara Maldonado as Paulina Cervantes-Bravo Forlan
Michelle Vieth as Karen Farias Rivas del Castillo

Supporting
 
Margarita Isabel as Otilia Álvarez Vda. de Velásquez
Claudio Báez as Don Federico Velásquez
Javier Ruán as Padre Domingo
Lupita Lara as Simona
Juan Peláez as Clemente Rivas del Castillo
Eric del Castillo as Don Germán
Paty Díaz as Belén
Odiseo Bichir as Tiberio Martínez Farías
Alejandro Ruiz as Silvestre
Sebastián as Luis "Luisito" Cervantes-Bravo Rivas del Castillo/Luis "Luisito" Cervantes-Bravo Velásquez
Silvia Manríquez as Ingrid
Elizabeth Aguilar as Chela
Julio Vega as Mario
Rodrigo Mejía as Rogelio Cervantes-Bravo Forlán
Manuel Medina as Pedro
Paola Treviño as Diana de Cervantes-Bravo
Ricardo Vera as Dr. Fuentes
Rocio Valente as Violeta
Lidice Pousa as Elsa Barrios
Alberto Salaberry as El Coyote
Benjamín Rivero as Mastín 
Sheyla as Mayeya
Reynaldo Rossano as Cortito
Gustavo Sánchez Parra as El Chacal
Carmen Salinas as Candelaria Gómez Vda. de Barrios

Special participation
Dulce as Aurora Cruz
Myrrha Saavedra as Soraya
René Strickler as Edgar Farias 
Irán Castillo as Cecilia
África Zavala as Aurora Cruz (young)

Awards and nominations

References

External links

2006 telenovelas
2006 Mexican television series debuts
2007 Mexican television series endings
Mexican telenovelas
Televisa telenovelas
Mexican television series based on Venezuelan television series
Spanish-language telenovelas